Seduced and Betrayed is a 1995 American television erotic thriller film directed by Félix Enríquez Alcalá. It stars Susan Lucci, David Charvet, Mary Ellen Trainor & Gabrielle Carteris. The film debuted on April 24, 1995 on NBC.

Plot

A beautiful but equally dangerous widow won't take "no" for an answer as she draws a dedicated family man into a world of passion, deceit and betrayal, threatening to destroy him in the process.

When a scheming widow hires a young contractor to renovate her home, she quickly turns the arrangement into much more than just a construction job. As she manipulates her young employee into a torrid affair, her target finally gives in for one night of passion. Realizing what he has done, the younger man insists that he cannot continue the relationship, but he soon finds that much more than his reputation is at stake.

Cast
 Susan Lucci as Victoria Landers
 David Charvet as Dan Hiller
 Mary Ellen Trainor as Charlotte
 Gabrielle Carteris as Cheryl Hiller

References

External links

1995 television films
1995 films
American erotic thriller films
NBC network original films
1990s thriller drama films
American thriller television films
Films directed by Félix Enríquez Alcalá
1990s English-language films
1990s American films